New Canaan High School is the only public high school in New Canaan, Connecticut.

In 2017, it was ranked the best public high school in Connecticut, and one of the top 200 in the nation. New Canaan High School was ranked the 74th best STEM high school in the nation  by U.S. News & World Report.

The school is a part of the Fairfield County Interscholastic Athletic Conference, otherwise known as the FCIAC. The New Canaan Rams have won numerous state championships. New Canaan is known for its competitive football, lacrosse, ice hockey, swimming, and tennis teams. Its football team holds 22 state championships and is consistently a top 10 team in the state. In 2016, its boys' lacrosse team was ranked 3rd in the nation.

History 

Construction on the current school building was finalized in 1971. The school is located on grounds donated by the Lapham family, carving off approximately 46 acres of Waveny Park.

In 2007, the school completed a multi-year, $60+ million renovation. An additional $14 million was spent on asbestos abatement, a portion of which was reimbursed through the settlement of an asbestos-related lawsuit.

In 2010, New Canaan High School won the National Library of the Year award from the American Association of School Librarians.

In August 2018, two lunch ladies from the school were arrested and accused of stealing about $500,000 from the cafeteria over a five-year period. The school received nationwide attention for the arrests.

Athletics 

New Canaan High School is part of the Fairfield County Interscholastic Athletic Conference (FCIAC). School teams have won state championships in football, lacrosse, soccer, basketball, swimming, golf, tennis, track and field, and cross country.

Football 
The school's football team, dubbed the Rams, has been led to 12 State Championships by coach Lou Marinelli, whose overall record at New Canaan is 321 wins, 96 losses, and 6 draws.

Basketball 
On January 10, 2019, one of the school's players, Ryan McAleer, made national headlines when he intercepted the ball from Stamford High midair with 0.9 seconds on the clock, then made a basket from half court, winning the game. Also in 2019, the team won the Connecticut Interscholastic Athletic Conference (CIAC) Division IV championship for the first time since 1962, defeating Granby Memorial High School 55–39. The boys' basketball team also earned CIAC class-level titles six times.

Notable alumni 

 Zach Allen (class of 2015), football defensive lineman for the Arizona Cardinals
 Andrew Campbell (Class of 2010), Olympic rower
 Curt Casali (Class of 2007), professional baseball catcher for the San Francisco Giants
 Charlie Cole, Olympic rower
 Ann Coulter (Class of 1980), conservative social and political commentator
 Peter Demmerle (Class of 1971), Notre Dame Fighting Irish football player
 Will Hanley (Class of 2008), basketball player
 Katherine Heigl (Class of 1997), actress, film producer, and former fashion model
 Michael McCusker (Class of 1984), film editor
 Martin Mull (Class of 1961), actor
 Lucas Niang (Class of 2016), football offensive tackle for the Kansas City Chiefs
 Max Pacioretty (Class of 2007), professional hockey left winger
 Drew Pyne (Class of 2020), football player for the University of Notre Dame
 Bill Roorbach (Class of 1971), author of short stories
 Bill Toomey (Class of 1957), athlete and 1968 Olympic decathlon champion
 Jon Vitti (Class of 1977), writer best known for his work on the television series The Simpsons
 Sid Yudain (Class of 1951), journalist who founded Roll Call

References

External links 
 

Buildings and structures in New Canaan, Connecticut
Schools in Fairfield County, Connecticut
Public high schools in Connecticut